Adeodatus or Adeodato are given names meaning "gift from God". Notable people with these names include:

Pope Adeodatus I (also known as Pope Deusdedit I), pope from 614 to 618
Pope Adeodatus II (sometimes referred to as Pope Adeodatus I), pope from 672 to 676
Deodatus of Nevers (died 679), saint and Bishop of Nevers, also called Adeodatus  
Adeodatus (372–388), son of Augustine of Hippo
 Adeodato Giovanni Piazza (1884–1957), Italian friar and cardinal
 Guglielmo Adeodato (died 1540), Italian bishop
 Adeodato Malatesta (1806–1891), Italian painter
 Adeodato Barreto (1905–1937), Luso-Goan poet
 Adeodato López (1906–1957), Mexican footballer

Latin masculine given names